Cross Valley is a valley  long in a northwest–southeast direction, cutting through the mid-part of Seymour Island, which lies south of the northeast end of the Antarctic Peninsula. It was discovered by the Swedish Antarctic Expedition under Otto Nordenskiöld, 1901–04, and named Querthal (cross valley) because of the transverse alignment of the valley.

References 

Valleys of Graham Land
Landforms of the James Ross Island group